The year 1614 in science and technology involved some significant events.

Mathematics
 Scottish mathematician John Napier publishes Mirifici Logarithmorum Canonis Descriptio ("Description of the Admirable Table of Logarithms"), outlining his discovery of logarithms and incorporating the decimal mark. Astronomer Johannes Kepler soon begins to employ logarithms in his description of the Solar System.

Medicine
 Felix Plater gives a description of Dupuytren's contracture.
 Sanctorius publishes De statica medicina, which will go through five editions in the following century.

Births
 February 14 – Bishop John Wilkins, English natural philosopher, co-founder of the Royal Society (died 1672)

Deaths
 July 28 – Felix Plater, Swiss physician (born 1536)
 Pedro Fernandes de Queirós, Portuguese-born navigator (born 1565)
 William Lee, English-born inventor (born c. 1563)

References

 
17th century in science
1610s in science